Placebo may refer to:
Placebo, a treatment without intrinsic therapeutic value, but administered as if it were a therapy, either in medical treatment or in clinical trials
Placebo (band), an alternative rock band from England formed in 1994
Placebo (album), the band's self-titled debut album
Placebo, a 1970s jazz band fronted by Marc Moulin
Placebo, a 1974 album
Placebo (at funeral) (obsolete usage), a singer of the Office of the Dead which includes the phrase "placebo Domino" meaning "please the Lord", and from that someone who falsely claims a connection to the deceased to get a share of the funeral meal
Placebo (ASP album), a 2022 album by ASP

See also
Placebo effect (disambiguation)
Placebo in history
Placebo-controlled studies
Observer effect (disambiguation)
Nocebo